Yippie usually refers to members of the Youth International Party, a radical counter-culture group founded in 1968.

Yippie may also refer to: 
 Yippie (lifestyle), a portmanteau of the terms "Yuppie" and "Hippie" used to describe a socially/environmentally conscious lifestyle without the "uptightness" of yuppies but more industrious and hygienic than hippies.  However, the term Huppie (also a portmanteau of Yuppie and Hippie) is generally preferred in this case to avoid confusion with members of the Youth International Party, who were also called Yippies.